Strauch's even-fingered gecko (Alsophylax loricatus) is a species of gecko found in Tajikistan, Uzbekistan, and perhaps Kyrgyzstan.

References

Alsophylax
Reptiles described in 1887